Plantain mosa is a Nigerian snacks which is a components of small chops. Other components of small chops include grilled chicken, spring roll, samosa and puff puff.

Mosa is similar to the Ghanaian Tatale except that it is made with over-ripe plantain, eggs and flour while the latter is made with same plantain, ginger and spices. Puff Puff and Mosa are also similar except that Mosa has the taste of Plantain.

Some other ingredients used in making plantain Mosa include onion, vegetable oil, bonnet pepper and yeast. The mashed plantain is deep fried until brown  alongside other ingredients  Mosa also be eaten as breakfast at home.

See also 
Nigerian cuisine
True plantains
Snack

References 

Pastries
Nigerian cuisine
African cuisine